Sistrionix is the debut studio album from American rock duo Deap Vally. Recorded in their Los Angeles hometown, the album was produced by Lars Stalfors, it was released on June 24, 2013 by Island Records, reaching No.38 on the UK charts.  The album's cover was painted by the late Australian painter Matt Doust.
The album received a nomination on the World Music Award for World’s Best Album.

Track listing

References

Island Records albums
2013 debut albums
Deap Vally albums